Sainte-Gemmes is a former commune in the Loir-et-Cher department of central France. On 1 January 2017, it was merged into the new commune Oucques la Nouvelle. Its population was 104 in 2019.

See also
Communes of the Loir-et-Cher department

References

Saintegemmes